Golden age hip hop is a name given to mainstream hip hop music created from the mid-1980s to early-mid 1990s, particularly by artists and musicians originating from the New York metropolitan area. An outgrowth of the new school hip hop movement, it is characterized by its diversity, quality, innovation and influence on hip hop after the genre's emergence and establishment in the old-school era, and is associated with the development and eventual mainstream success of hip hop. There were various types of subject matter, while the music was experimental and the sampling from old records was eclectic.

The artists most often associated with the period are LL Cool J, Slick Rick, Ultramagnetic MC's, the Jungle Brothers, Run-D.M.C., Public Enemy, Beastie Boys, KRS-One, Eric B. & Rakim, De La Soul, Big Daddy Kane, EPMD, Biz Markie, Salt-N-Pepa, Queen Latifah, Gang Starr, and A Tribe Called Quest. Releases by these acts co-existed in this period with, and were as commercially viable as, those of early gangsta rap artists such as Schoolly D, Ice-T, Geto Boys, N.W.A, the sex raps of 2 Live Crew and Too Short, and party-oriented music by acts such as the Fat Boys, DJ Jazzy Jeff & the Fresh Prince, MC Hammer, and Vanilla Ice.

Description 

The golden age is noted for its innovation – a time "when it seemed that every new single reinvented the genre," according to Rolling Stone. Referring to "hip-hop in its golden age", Spin's editor-in-chief Sia Michel said, "there were so many important, groundbreaking albums coming out right about that time",
and MTV's Sway Calloway added: "The thing that made that era so great is that nothing was contrived. Everything was still being discovered and everything was still innovative and new". Writer William Jelani Cobb said, "what made the era they inaugurated worthy of the term golden was the sheer number of stylistic innovations that came into existence... in these golden years, a critical mass of mic prodigies were literally creating themselves and their art form at the same time".

The term "Golden age hip hop" frames the late 1980s in mainstream hip hop, said to be characterized by its diversity, quality, innovation and influence, and associated with Public Enemy, KRS-One and his Boogie Down Productions, Eric B. & Rakim, Ultramagnetic MCs, De La Soul, A Tribe Called Quest, and the Jungle Brothers due to their themes of Afrocentricity and political militancy, their experimental music, and their eclectic sampling. This same period is sometimes referred to as "mid-school" or a "middle school" in hip hop, the phrase covering acts such as Gang Starr, the UMC's, Main Source, Lord Finesse, EPMD, Just Ice, Stetsasonic, True Mathematics, and Mantronix.

The innovations of Run-D.M.C., LL Cool J, and new school producers such as Larry Smith, and Rick Rubin of Def Jam Recordings, were quickly advanced on by the Beastie Boys, Marley Marl and his Juice Crew MCs, Boogie Down Productions, Public Enemy, and Eric B. & Rakim. Hip hop production became denser, rhymes and beats faster, as the drum machine was augmented with the sampler technology. Rakim took lyrics about the art of rapping to new heights, while KRS-One and Chuck D pushed "message rap" towards black activism. Native Tongues artists' inclusive, sample-crowded music accompanied their positivity, Afrocentricity and playful energy.

During the golden age of hip hop, samples were heavily used. The ability to sample different beats, riffs and patterns from a wide variety of sources gave birth to a new breed of producers and DJs who did not necessarily need formal musical training or instruments, just a good ear for sound collages. These samples were derived from a number of genres, ranging from jazz, funk and soul to rock and roll. For example, Paul's Boutique, the Beastie Boys' second studio album, drew from over 200 individual samples, 24 of which were featured on the last track of the album. Samples and sound bites were not limited to just music. RZA of the Wu-Tang Clan, a hip hop collective formed in the 1990s, sampled sound clips from his own collection of 1970s kung-fu films to bolster and frame the group's gritty lyrical content. Many of the sample-laden albums released during this time would not be able to receive legal clearance today.

The era also provided some of the greatest advances in rapping technique. Kool G Rap, referring to the golden age in the book How to Rap said, "that era bred rappers like a Big Daddy Kane, a KRS-One, a Rakim, a Chuck D... their rapping capability and ability – these dudes were phenomenal". Many of hip hop's biggest artists were also at their creative peak. Allmusic said the golden age "witnessed the best recordings from some of the biggest rappers in the genre's history... overwhelmingly based in New York City, golden age rap is characterized by skeletal beats, samples cribbed from hard rock or soul tracks, and tough dis raps... rhymers like PE's Chuck D, Big Daddy Kane, KRS-One, Rakim, and LL Cool J basically invented the complex wordplay and lyrical kung-fu of later hip-hop".

In addition to lyrical self-glorification, hip hop was also used as a form of social protest. Lyrical content from the era often drew attention to a variety of social issues including Afrocentric living, drug use, crime and violence, religion, culture, the state of the American economy, and the modern man's struggle. Conscious and political hip hop tracks of the time were a response to the effects of American capitalism and former President Reagan's conservative political economy. According to Rose Tricia, "In rap, relationships between black cultural practice, social and economic conditions, technology, sexual and racial politics, and the institution policing of the popular terrain are complex and in constant motion. Even though hip hop was used as a mechanism for different social issues it was still very complex with issues within the movement itself.

There was also often an emphasis on black nationalism. Hip hop scholar Michael Eric Dyson stated, "during the golden age of hip hop, from 1987 to 1993, Afrocentric and black nationalist rap were prominent", and critic Scott Thill described the time as "the golden age of hip hop, the late '80s and early '90s when the form most capably fused the militancy of its Black Panther and Watts Prophets forebears with the wide-open cultural experimentalism of De La Soul and others". Stylistic variety was also prominent; MSNBC said that in the golden age, "rappers had an individual sound that was dictated by their region and their communities, not by a marketing strategist," the Village Voice referred to the golden age's "eclecticism", and Ben Duinker and Denis Martin of Empirical Musicology Review wrote that "The constant flow of new, boundary-pushing Golden Age album releases exemplifies this era's unprecedented stylistic fluidity."

Time period 

AllMusic writes, "Hip-hop's golden age is bookended by the commercial breakthrough of Run-D.M.C. in 1986 and the explosion of gangsta rap with NWA in the late 80s and Dr. Dre and Snoop Doggy Dogg in 1993." However, the specific time period that the golden age covers varies among different sources. The New York Times also defines hip-hop's golden age as the "late 1980s and early 90s". Ed Simons of the Chemical Brothers said, "there was that golden age of hip-hop in the early 90s when the Jungle Brothers made Straight Out the Jungle and De La Soul made Three Feet High and Rising" (though these records were in fact made in 1988 and 1989 respectively). MSNBC called the 1980s the "Golden Age" of hip-hop music. The Guardian states, "The golden age of hip-hop, from 1986 to 1993, gave the world an amazing number of great records," and also describes the period in November 1993, when A Tribe Called Quest and Wu-Tang Clan released albums, as "The Next Golden age."

The golden age is described by scholar Mickey Hess as "circa 1986-1994." Carl Stoffers of New York Daily News describes the golden age as "spanning from approximately 1986 to 1997." Brad Callas of Medium.com writes that "Hip-Hop's Golden Age is loosely bookended by the genre's commercial breakthrough in the late 1980s and the back-to-back deaths of 2Pac and Biggie in the late 1990s." In their article "In Search of the Golden Age Hip-Hop Sound", music theorists Ben Duinker and Denis Martin of Empirical Musicology Review use "the 11 years between and including 1986 and 1996 as chronological boundaries" to define the golden age, bookended by the releases of Raising Hell and License to Ill and the deaths of Tupac Shakur and the Notorious B.I.G. Will Lavin of uDiscover Music states "It's generally accepted that the Golden Age occurred from the mid '80s and mid '90s; it was then that all the elements of the culture – breaking, graffiti art and DJing – broke cover to enter the mainstream." Music critic Tony Green, in the book Classic Material, refers to the two-year period 1993–1994 as "a second Golden Age" that saw influential, high-quality albums using elements of past classicism – drum machines (Roland TR-808), drum samplers (Akai MPC60, E-mu SP-1200), turntable scratches, references to old school hip hop hits, and "tongue-twisting triplet verbalisms" – while making clear that new directions were being taken. Green lists as examples the Wu-Tang Clan's Enter the Wu-Tang (36 Chambers), Nas's Illmatic, De La Soul's 1993 release Buhloone Mindstate, Snoop Doggy Dogg's Doggystyle, A Tribe Called Quest's third album Midnight Marauders and the Outkast debut Southernplayalisticadillacmuzik. Dart Adams of Festival Peak described this "2nd Golden Era" as spanning 1992 to 1996, and cites the release of Puff Daddy and Mase's "Can't Nobody Hold Me Down" in 1997 as being the start of mainstream rap's "Jiggy Era".

According to copyright, music, and pop culture scholars Kembrew Mcleod and Peter DiCola, the golden age of hip-hop sampling spans from 1987 to 1992. Artists and record labels were not yet aware of the permanence of hip-hop culture in mainstream media, and did not yet accept it as a legitimate institution. They believe the ruling made in Grand Upright Music, Ltd. v. Warner Bros. Records Inc. marked the end of the golden age of hip hop and its sampling practices.

Juice Crew
       
Notable hip hop producer and innovator, Marley Marl, formed the Juice Crew hip hop collective. Marl also founded Cold Chillin' Records and assembled various hip hop acts, including MC Shan, Big Daddy Kane, Biz Markie, Roxanne Shanté, Kool G Rap & DJ Polo, and Masta Ace. His Juice Crew collective was an important force in ushering the "golden age" era of hip hop, with advances in lyrical technique, distinctive personalities of emerging artists like Biz Markie and Big Daddy Kane, and attaining crossover commercial success for hip hop music. Marley Marl's first production was an "answer record" to "Sucker MCs" in 1983 entitled "Sucker DJs" by Dimples D. Soon after came 14-year-old Roxanne Shanté's answer to UTFO's "Roxanne Roxanne", "Roxanne's Revenge" (1985), sparking off the huge wave of answer records known as the Roxanne Wars. More disses (insults intended to show disrespect) from Shanté followed: "Bite This" (1985), "Queen of Rox" (1985), introducing Biz Markie on "Def Fresh Crew" (1986), "Payback" (1987), and "Have a Nice Day" (1987).

Boogie Down Productions
Shante's "Have a Nice Day" had aimed some barbs at the principal two members of a new group from the Bronx called Boogie Down Productions (BDP): "Now KRS-ONE you should go on vacation with that name soundin' like a wack radio station, and as for Scott La Rock, you should be ashamed, when T La Rock said "It's Yours", he didn't mean his name". Boogie Down Productions had manufactured a disagreement with the Juice Crew's MC Shan, releasing "South Bronx" and "The Bridge is Over" in reply to his "The Bridge" and "Kill That Noise" respectively. KRS-One considered Run-D.M.C. the epitome of rap music in 1984 and had begun to rap following their lead. He has also said that BDP's approach reflected a feeling that the early innovators like Run-D.M.C. and LL Cool J were by 1986 tainted by commercial success and out of touch with the streets.

Boogie Down's first album Criminal Minded (1987) admitted a reggae influence and had KRS-One imitating the Beatles' "Hey Jude" on the title track. It also contained two tales of grim street life, yet played for callous laughs: "The P Is Free", in which KRS speaks of throwing out his girl who wants crack cocaine in exchange for sex, and "9mm Goes Bang", in which he shoots a drug dealer then cheerfully sings "la la la la la la". Songs like these presaged the rise of an underground that matched violent lyrics to the hardcore drum machine tracks of the new school. The cover of Criminal Minded was a further reflection of a move towards this sort of radical image, depicting the group in a half-light, holding firearms. The next album By All Means Necessary (1988) left that element behind for political radicalism following the murder of Scott La Rock, with its title and cover alluding to Malcolm X. KRS-One became involved with the Stop the Violence Movement at this time. Boogie Down Productions, along with Run-D.M.C. and Public Enemy, associated the new school as rap music with a strong message.

Eric B. and Rakim
Eric B. & Rakim appeared with the Marley Marl produced "Eric B. Is President" and "My Melody" on Zakia Records in 1986. Both tracks appeared on Paid in Full (1987). Just as Boogie Down Productions had, the pair reflected changes in street life on their debut's cover, which depicted the two wearing large gold chains and surrounded by money. Like Criminal Minded, the sampling prevalent in the album cemented James Brown's status as a hip hop source, while Rakim's allusions showed the growing influence of mystic Islam-offshoot The Nation of Gods and Earths in hip-hop. The music was minimalist, austerely so, with many writers noting that coupled with Rakim's precise, logical style, the effect was almost one of scientific rigour. The group followed Paid in Full with Follow the Leader (1988) (on which they were open-minded enough to sample the Eagles), Let the Rhythm Hit 'Em (1990) and Don't Sweat the Technique (1992).

Rakim is generally regarded as the most cutting-edge of the MCs of the new school era.
Jess Harvell in Pitchfork in 2005 wrote that "Rakim's innovation was applying a patina of intellectual detachment to rap's most sacred cause: talking shit about how you're a better rapper than everyone else." Christgau in the Village Voice in 1990 wrote of Rakim's style as "calm, confident, clear. On their third album, as on their phase-shifting 1986 debut," he continues, "Eric B.'s samples truly are beats, designed to accentuate the natural music of an idealized black man's voice." Looking back at the late eighties in Rolling Stone in 1997, Ed Moralez describes Rakim as "the new-school MC of the moment, using a smooth baritone to become the jazz soloist of mystic Afrocentric rap."

Public Enemy
Public Enemy, having been reluctantly convinced to sign to a record label, released Yo! Bum Rush the Show on Def Jam in 1987. It debuted the Public Enemy logo, a circle of hatted b-boy in a sniper's cross-hairs, was replete with battle rhymes ("Miuzi Weighs a Ton", "Public Enemy #1"), social-political fare ("Rightstarter (Message to a Black Man)") and anti-crack messages ("Megablast"). The album was a critical and commercial success, particularly in Europe, unusually so for a hip hop album at that time. Bumrush the Show had been recorded on the heels of Run-D.M.C.'s Raising Hell, but was held back by Def Jam in order for them to concentrate on releasing and promoting the Beastie Boys' License to Ill. Chuck D of Public Enemy felt that by the time their first record was released, Boogie Down Productions and Rakim had already changed the landscape for how an MC could rap. Public Enemy were already recording their second album It Takes a Nation of Millions to Hold Us Back (Def Jam, 1988) when Bumrush hit stores.

Gangsta rap

The underground sound, centered on urban violence, that was to become gangsta rap, existed on the East Coast soon after Run-D.M.C. had inaugurated the new school of hip hop. Philadelphia's Schoolly D self-released "Gangsta Boogie" in 1984, and "P.S.K. What Does It Mean?"/"Gucci Time" in 1985, leading to Saturday Night (Schoolly D, 1986, Jive, 1987). The West Coast, which became the home of gangsta rap, had Toddy Tee's influential Batteram mixtape in 1985, and Ice-T's "Six in the Morning" in 1986 before N.W.A's first records, leading to the hugely successful Straight Outta Compton in 1988.

Native Tongues
Developments in the New York new school continuum in this climate were represented by the Native Tongues groups—The Jungle Brothers, De La Soul, A Tribe Called Quest, Queen Latifah, Chi-Ali, and Monie Love—along with fellow travellers like Leaders of the New School, KMD and Brand Nubian. They moved away from aggressive, macho posturing, towards ambiguity, fun and Afrocentricity. Their music was sample-crowded, more open and accessible than their new school predecessors. De La Soul's debut sampled everyone from the Turtles to Steely Dan, while A Tribe Called Quest matched tough beats to mellow jazz samples and playful, thoughtful raps.

Legal cases

Grand Upright Music, Ltd. v. Warner Bros. Records Inc. 
This lawsuit was known for effectively ending the "Wild West" period for sampling during the golden age of hip hop. In 1991, Gilbert O'Sullivan's song publisher sued Warner Brothers Records over the use of the original in Biz Markie's song "Alone Again." No copyright case precedents were cited in the ruling of the final verdict, and the presiding judge's opinion was prefaced with the words "Thou Shalt not Steal."

The Turtles v. De La Soul 
The sixties pop band The Turtles filed a lawsuit in 1989 against hip hop group De La Soul for the uncleared use of a sampled element derived from their original 1968 track "You Showed Me." The lawsuit was settled out of court for a reported $1.7 million, though group members later claimed that the actual payout was significantly less.

See also 
 Album era
 Progressive rap

References 

1980s in music
1990s in music
African-American culture
African-American music
hip hop
Nostalgia in the United States
History of hip hop
American hip hop